The following is the filmography for actor Kevin Bacon. His most notable roles have been in National Lampoon's Animal House (1978), Friday the 13th (1980), Diner (1982), Footloose (1984), Quicksilver (1986), She's Having a Baby (1988), Flatliners and Tremors (both 1990), He Said, She Said and JFK (both 1991), A Few Good Men (1992),  The River Wild (1994), The Air Up There (1994), Murder in the First and Apollo 13 (both 1995), Sleepers (1996), Wild Things (1998), Stir of Echoes (1999), Hollow Man and My Dog Skip (both 2000), Trapped (2002), Mystic River (2003), The Woodsman (2004), Death Sentence (2007), Frost/Nixon (2008), X-Men: First Class and Crazy, Stupid, Love (both 2011), Black Mass (2015), Patriots Day (2016) and The Darkness (2016).

In 2009, he starred in the television movie Taking Chance, for which he won a Golden Globe Award for Best Actor – Miniseries or Television Film and the Screen Actors Guild Award for Outstanding Performance by a Male Actor in a Miniseries or Television Movie. He had previously won a Screen Actors Guild Award in 1995 as part of the ensemble cast of Apollo 13. In 2013, Bacon starred in the Fox television series The Following in his first regular role on television, for which he won a Saturn Award for Best Actor on Television.

Film

Television

As director

See also
Six Degrees of Kevin Bacon

References

External links
 

Bacon, Kevin
Bacon, Kevin